Dorobanțu is a commune in Călărași County, Muntenia, Romania. It is composed of three villages: Boșneagu, Dorobanțu and Vărăști.

As of 2011, the population of Dorobanțu is 3,065.

References

Communes in Călărași County
Localities in Muntenia